Bofills Båge (Swedish: "Bofill's Crescent") is a residential building on Södermalm, Stockholm, Sweden, at . The building was designed by the Spanish architect Ricardo Bofill and constructed between 1991 and 1992. 

The building complex is formed by the crescent-shaped building with a diameter of 180 metres, along with a total of five smaller apartment buildings. The complex contains about 300 apartments, shops, offices and underground parking space. It forms part of a large urban redevelopment where the old southern railyard was converted into city blocks mainly with housing developments. The Crescent is flanked by Söder Torn, a residential highrise building designed by Henning Larsen.

In the architect's words, "The crescent façade is of simple, pure lines in accordance with traditional Nordic architecture."

See also
 Architecture of Stockholm
 List of works by Ricardo Bofill Taller de Arquitectura

References 

Ricardo Bofill: Bofills Båge

Residential buildings completed in 1992
1992 establishments in Sweden
Residential buildings in Sweden
Buildings and structures in Stockholm
Crescents (architecture)
Ricardo Bofill buildings
Postmodern architecture